Logos Foundation was an influential and controversial Christian ministry that flourished in Australia in the 1970s and 1980s under the leadership of Howard Carter, originally a Baptist pastor from Auckland, New Zealand. Logos Foundation was initially a trans-denominational charismatic teaching ministry, primarily Protestant but with some ties to Catholic lay groups and individuals.

The Logos Foundation was Reconstructionist, Restorationist, and Dominionist in its theology and works.

Early history
The ministry was established by Paul Collins  in New Zealand as a trans-denominational teaching ministry serving the Charismatic Renewal through publishing the Logos Magazine. Paul Collins moved it to Sydney, Australia around 1969, where it also facilitated large trans-denominational renewal conferences in venues such as Sydney Town Hall and the Wentworth Hotel. It was transferred to Howard Carter's leadership, relocating to Hazelbrook, in the Blue Mountains of New South Wales ,for a few years, and in the mid-1970s to Blackheath, in the upper Blue Mountains. During these years ,the teaching ministry attracted like-minded fellowships and home groups into loose association with it.

Publishing became a significant operation, distributing charismatic themed and Restorationist teachings focused on Christian maturity and Christ's pre-eminence in short books and the monthly Logos/Restore Magazine (associated with New Wine Magazine, USA). It held annual weeklong conferences of over 1,000 registrants, featuring international charismatic speakers, including Derek Prince, Ern Baxter, Don Basham, Charles Simpson, Bob Mumford, Kevin Conner (Australia), Peter Morrow (New Zealand) and others.

A Bible College was also established nearby at Westwood Lodge, Mount Victoria. At the main site in Blackheath, a Christian K–12 school, Mountains Christian Academy was established, which was a forerunner of more widespread Christian independent schools and home schooling as a hallmark of the movement. It carried over the Old Covenant practice of tithing (to the local church), and expected regular sacrificial giving beyond this.

Theologically it taught orthodox Christian core beliefs. However, in matters of opinion Logos teaching was presented as authoritative, and alternative views were discouraged.  Those who questioned this teaching tended to leave the movement eventually.  Over time, a strong cult-like culture of group conformity developed and those who dared to question were quickly brought into line by other members with automated responses shrouded in spiritualized expression.  In some instances the leadership engaged in bullying-type behavior to enforce unquestioning compliance.  The group viewed itself as separate from "the world" and any alternative views and even other expressions, denominations or interpretations of Christianity were regarded at best as suspect but mostly as false.

From the mid-1970s a hierarchical ecclesiology was adopted in the form of the Shepherding Movement's whole-of-life discipleship of members by personal pastors (usually their "cell group" leader), who in turn were accountable ao their personal pastors.  Followers were informed that even their leader, Howard Carter, related as a disciple to the apostolic group in Christian Growth Ministries of Bob Mumford, Charles Simpson, Ern Baxter, Derek Prince, and Don Basham, in Ft Lauderdale, USA (whose network was estimated to have approx. 150,000 people involved at its peak c.1985). Howard Carter's primary pastoral relationship was with Ern Baxter, a pioneer of the Healing Revival of the 1950s and the Charismatic Renewal of the 1960s, 70s, and 80s. Written covenants of submission to the individual church pastors were encouraged for the members of one representative church, Christian Faith Centre (Sydney), and were said to be common practice throughout the movement at the time.

In 1980 the Logos movement churches adopted the name "Australian Fellowship of Covenant Communities" (AFoCC), and were led through an eschatological shift in the early 1980s from the pre-millennialism of many Pentecostals (described as a theology of defeat), to the post-millennialism of the Presbyterian Reconstructionist theonomists (described as a theology of victory). Some senior leaders, like Pastor David Jackson of the Christian Faith Centre in Sydney, left the movement when it changed to a more open theological-political paradigm. In the mid-1980s AFoCC rebranded yet again as the Covenant Evangelical Church (not associated with the Evangelical Covenant Church in the USA). The Logos Foundation brand name continued as the educational, commercial, and political arm of the Covenant Evangelical Church.

It moved for the final time in 1987 to Toowoomba, Queensland, where there were already associated fellowships and a demographic environment highly conducive to the growth of extreme right-wing religio-political movements.  This fertile ground saw the movement peak in a short time, reaching a local support base of upwards of 2,000 people.

The 1980s move to Queensland
The move to Toowoomba involved much preparation, including members selling homes and other assets in New South Wales and the Logos Foundation acquiring many homes, businesses and commercial properties in Toowoomba and the Darling Downs.

In the process of relocating the organisation and most of its members, it absorbed a number of other small Christian Churches in Toowoomba. Some of these were house churches/groups more or less affiliated with Carter's other organisations.  Carter and some of his followers attempted to make links with Queensland Premier Johannes Bjelke-Petersen, a known Christian conservative, in order to further their goals.

Carter continued to lead the shift in eschatology to post-millennialism and prominently religio-political in nature.  More of his leadership team left the movement as Carter's style became more authoritarian and cultish. Colin Shaw was a key member at this time, who believed that Pastor Howard Carter was an "anointed man of God" and Shaw later became the "right-hand" man of Carter in his "outreach and missionary works" in Quezon City, Philippines. Logos used this Filipino church, the Christian Renewal Center (a moderate Pentecostal/Charismatic church) as their base to advance and promote the teachings of the Shepherding Movement. With local assistance in the Philippines, Colin Shaw coordinated and sponsored under the Christian Renewal Centre's name, conferences featuring Carter.   Many poorly educated and sincere Filipino pastors and locals, usually from small churches were influenced to support the wider Logos movement and to tithe from their limited funds into it. However, soon after the revelation of Howard Carter's scandalous immorality and corrupt lifestyle broke, the Filipino wing of Logos dissolved and dispersed back into established local churches. Colin Shaw was said to abandon the Shepherding movement at this time and engaged in soul searching and self exile for a time, fueled by severe guilt over the way these Filipino Christians were manipulated.

In 1989 Logos controversially involved itself in the Queensland State election, running a campaign of surveys and full-page newspaper advertisements promoting the line that candidates' adherence to Christian principles and biblical ethics was more important than the widespread corruption in the Queensland government that had been revealed by the Fitzgerald Inquiry.  Published advertisements in the Courier-Mail at the time promoted strongly conservative positions in opposition to pornography, homosexuality and abortion, and a return to the death penalty.  Some supporters controversially advocated Old Testament laws and penalties. This action backfired sensationally, with many mainstream Churches, community leaders and religious organisations distancing themselves from the Logos Foundation after making public statements denouncing them.   At times the death penalty for homosexuals was advocated, in accordance with Old Testament Law. The Sydney Morning Herald later described part of this campaign when they published, "Homosexuality and censorship should determine your vote, the electorate was told; corruption was not the major concern."  The same article quoted Carter from a letter he had written to supporters at the time, "The greenies, the gays and the greedy are marching.  Now the Christians, the conservatives and the concerned must march also".  These views were not new. An earlier article published in the Herald quoted a Logos spokesman in reference to the call for the death penalty for homosexuals in order to rid Queensland of such people, who stated "the fact a law is on the statutes is the best safeguard for society".

Although similar behaviours existed prior, these last years in Queensland saw Logos Foundation develop cult-like tendencies. This authoritarian environment degenerated into a perverse and unbiblical abuse of power.  Obedience and unhealthy submission to human leaders was cultish in many ways and the concept of submission for the purpose of 'spiritual covering' became a dominant theme in their teaching.  This idea of spiritual covering soon perverted into a system of overt abuse of power over people's lives. This occurred despite opposition to the Shepherding movement from respected evangelical and Pentecostal leaders in the United States beginning as early as 1975.  However, in Australia, through the Logos Foundation and Covenant Evangelical Church, this movement flourished beyond the time that it had effectively entered a period of decline in North America.  Followers in Australia, were effectively quarantined by Carter from the truth of what had begun to play out in the U.S.A.

Other connections
The movement had ties to a number of other groups including World MAP (Ralph Mahoney), California; Christian Growth Ministries, Fort Lauderdale; and Rousas Rushdoony, the father of Christian Reconstructionism in the United States. Activities included printing, publishing, conferencing, home schooling and ministry training.  Logos Foundation (Australia) and these other organizations at times issued theological qualifications and other apparently academic degrees, master's degrees and doctorates following no formal process of study or recognized rigour, often under a range of dubious names that included the word "University".  Carter conferred on himself a Master of Arts degree in 1987 which was apparently issued by the Pacific College Theological.  Visiting preachers from the United States were frequently gifted such 'qualifications' by Carter including a PhD purportedly issued by the University of Oceania Sancto Spiritus (University of Oceania & the holy spirit).  The recipient thereafter used the title of Doctor in his itinerant preaching and revival ministry throughout North America.

Demise, dissolution and ongoing influence today
The Shepherding movement worldwide descended into a cultish movement characterized by manipulative relationships, abuse of power and dubious financial arrangements.   It had been an attempt by mostly sincere people, to free Christianity of the entrenched reductions of  traditional and consumerist religion. However, with its emphasis on authority and submissive accountability, the movement was open to abuse. This, combined with spiritual hunger, an early measure of success and growth, mixed motives, and the inexperience of new leaders all coalesced to form a dangerous and volatile mix.  Howard Carter played these factors skillfully to entrench his own position.

The Logos Foundation and Covenant Evangelical Church did not survive long the scandal of Howard Carter's standing down and public exposure of  adultery in 1990.  Hey (2010) has stated in his thesis, "Suggested reasons for Carter's failure have included insecurity, an inability to open up to others, arrogance and over confidence in his own ability". Like many modern evangelists and mega-church leaders, he was placed on a pedestal by the movement's followers.  This environment where the leader was not subject to true accountability, allowed his deception and double life to flourish unknown for many years.  In the years immediately prior to this scandal, those who dared to question were quickly derided by other members or even disciplined, thus reinforcing a very unhealthy environment. When the scandal of Carter's immorality was revealed, full details of the lavish lifestyle to which he had become accustomed were also exposed.  Carter's frequent travel to North America was lavish and extravagant, utilizing first class flights and five-star hotels.  The full financial affairs of the organization prior to the collapse were highly secretive.  Most members had been unaware of how vast sums of money involved in the whole operation were being channelled nor were they aware of how the leaders' access to these funds were being managed.

The remaining members started a new church, Toowoomba City Church, under the leadership of former Logos leader Ian Shelton. Ian's son Lyle Shelton (lobbyist) eventually became the managing director of the Australian Christian Lobby, a political lobby group that seeks to promote "Christian Values" and continues to push the same views as Logos regarding sexuality, abortion and religious freedom. 

A significant number of quite senior ex-Logos members found acceptance in the now defunct Rangeville Uniting Church. The congregation of the Rangeville Uniting Church left the Uniting Church to become an independent congregation known as the Rangeville Community Church. Prior to the Rangeville Uniting Church closing an earlier split resulted in a significant percentage of the total congregation contributing to the formation of the Range Christian Fellowship in Blake Street Toowoomba.

References

External links
Article on Toowoomba churches

Christian educational organizations
Toowoomba